Oldřich Machala (born 4 August 1963) is a Czech football coach and a former player.

Career
Machala was born in Bruntál. He played most of his Gambrinus liga career for SK Sigma Olomouc, for which he earned 414 league caps, most in the club's history. He is considered a legendary footballer of the club. In 2000, he won the Personality of the League award at the Czech Footballer of the Year awards. He won his only cap for the Czech Republic as a last-minute substitute against Nigeria in 1996.

Machala joined 1. HFK Olomouc as manager in 2011 and led his team to the Moravian–Silesian Football League title and ensuing promotion to the Czech 2. Liga in his first season with the club.

References

External links
 
 

1963 births
Living people
People from Bruntál
Czech footballers
Czech Republic international footballers
Czech First League players
SK Sigma Olomouc players
FC Hansa Rostock players
VfB Oldenburg players
Bundesliga players
2. Bundesliga players
Czech football managers
FC Hradec Králové managers
1. HFK Olomouc managers
Association football defenders
Sportspeople from the Moravian-Silesian Region